Asociația Club Sportiv Înainte Modelu, commonly known as Înainte Modelu, or simply as Modelu, is a Romanian  football club based in Modelu, Călărași County, founded in 2009. The club is currently playing in the Liga III.

History 
Înainte Modelu was founded in 2009 in order to continue the football tradition in the commune after the dissolution of former Liga II side Prefab 05 Modelu. Înainte managed to won Liga IV – Călărași County in 2014, at five years after their foundation, subsequently winning the promotion play-off against Petrolul Roata and promoting to Liga III, for the first time in the history of the club.

In the third tier, Înainte won the reputation of an uncomfortable team being ranked: 8th (2014–15), 6th (2015–16), 8th (2017–18) and 7th (2018–19), with only a bottom side classification, a 12 place at the end of the 2016–17 season.

Grounds
Înainte Modelu plays its home matches on Vasile Enache Stadium in Modelu, Călărași County, with a capacity of 1,000 seats. The old stadium of Prefab 05, Prefab Stadium, with a capacity of 5,000 seats is unused, being in a state of degradation.

Honours
Liga IV – Călărași County
Winners (1): 2013–14
Runners-up (1): 2011–12

Players

First-team squad

Out on loan

Club Officials

Board of directors

Current technical staff

League history

References

External links

Înainte Modelu at soccerway.com
Înainte Modelu at AJF Călărași

Association football clubs established in 2009
Football clubs in Călărași County
Liga III clubs
Liga IV clubs
2009 establishments in Romania